Een beetje verliefd can refer to:

 Een beetje verliefd (song), song by André Hazes
 'N Beetje Verliefd, 2006 Dutch film